Siu Hang Tsuen is a village of Hong Kong, located in Lung Yeuk Tau, Fanling, North District. It is one of the five Wai (walled villages) and six Tsuen (villages) in Lung Yeuk Tau. Siu Hang Tsuen is located directly to its west.

Administration
Siu Hang San Tsuen is a recognized village under the New Territories Small House Policy. Siu Hang Tsuen is one of the villages represented within the Fanling District Rural Committee. For electoral purposes, Siu Hang Tsuen is part of the Queen's Hill constituency, which is currently represented by Law Ting-tak.

History
At the time of the 1911 census, the population of Siu Hang was 42. The number of males was 25.

References

External links

 Delineation of area of existing village Siu Hang San Tsuen (Fanling) for election of resident representative (2019 to 2022)
 Antiquities and Monuments Office. Hong Kong Traditional Chinese Architectural Information System. Siu Hang Tsuen (North)
 Antiquities Advisory Board. Historic Building Appraisal. Fuk Tak Temple, Siu Hang Tsuen, Fanling Pictures

Villages in North District, Hong Kong
Lung Yeuk Tau